Austrocylindropuntia subulata is a species of cactus native to the Peruvian Andes. The Latin specific epithet subulata means "awl-like", referring to the shape of the rudimentary leaves. It is also known by its common names as Eve's pin and Eve's needle.

Description 
The stems are marked by rhomboid to ovate bumps in a few spiral rows.

The fruit are ovoid or club-like and sometimes thorny.

Distribution
A. subulata probably comes from the Peruvian Andes, where it is common at altitudes above . Today it has been naturalised in Argentina and Bolivia. It has been introduced in the Mediterranean basin to form impassable hedges, but it has become invasive in coastal provinces and some in the Iberian interior. It is also invasive in Australia, and is a declared Weed of National Significance.

Classification 

The first description as Pereskia subulata took place in 1845 by Friedrich Mühlenpfordt. Curt Backeberg classified it in the genus Austrocylindropuntia in 1942.

References

Image gallery 

Opuntioideae
Cacti of South America